Sun-Yung Alice Chang (born 1948) is a Taiwanese American mathematician specializing in aspects of mathematical analysis ranging from harmonic analysis and partial differential equations to differential geometry.  She is the Eugene Higgins Professor of Mathematics at Princeton University.

Life
Chang was born in Xian, China in 1948 and grew up in Taiwan. She received her Bachelor of Science degree in 1970 from National Taiwan University, and her doctorate in 1974 from the University of California, Berkeley. At Berkeley, Chang wrote her thesis on the study of bounded analytic functions. Chang became a full professor at UCLA in 1980 before moving to Princeton in 1998.

Career and research
Chang's research interests include the study of geometric types of nonlinear partial differential equations and problems in isospectral geometry. Working with her husband Paul Yang and others, she produced contributions to differential equations in relation to geometry and topology.

She teaches at Princeton University as of 1998. Before that, she held visiting positions at University of California-Berkeley; Institute for Advanced Study, Princeton, N.J.; and Swiss Federal Institute of Technology, Zurich, Switzerland. She served at Swiss Federal Institute of Technology as a visiting professor in 2015.

In 2004, she was interviewed by Yu Kiang Leong for Creative Minds, Charmed Lives: Interviews at Institute for Mathematical Sciences, National University of Singapore, and she declared:«In the mathematical community, we should leave room for people who want to do work in their own way. Mathematical research is not just a scientific approach; the nature of mathematics is sometimes close to that of art. Some people want individual character and an individual way of working things out. They should be appreciated too. There should be room for single research and collaborative research».

Chang's life was profiled in the 2017 documentary film Girls who fell in love with Math.

Service and honors
Sloan Foundation Research Fellowship, 1979–1981
Invited speaker at the International Congress of Mathematicians in Berkeley, 1986 
Vice president of the American Mathematical Society, 1989-1991
Ruth Lyttle Satter Prize in Mathematics of the American Mathematical Society, 1995 
Guggenheim Fellowship, 1998 
Plenary Speaker at the International Congress of Mathematicians in Beijing, 2002
Member, American Academy of Arts and Sciences, 2008 
 Honorary Degree, UPMC, 2013 
Fellow, National Academy of Sciences, 2009 
Fellow, Academia Sinica, 2012
Fellow, American Mathematical Society, 2015
Fellow, Association for Women in Mathematics, 2019
MSRI Simons Professor, 2015-2016

Publications
J. Differential Geom. 27 (1988), no. 2, 259–296.
Acta Math. 159 (1987), no. 3–4, 215–259.
Chang, Sun-Yung A.; Yang, Paul C. Extremal metrics of zeta function determinants on 4-manifolds. Ann. of Math. (2) 142 (1995), no. 1, 171–212.
Chang, Sun-Yung A.; Gursky, Matthew J.; Yang, Paul C. The scalar curvature equation on 2- and 3-spheres. Calc. Var. Partial Differential Equations 1 (1993), no. 2, 205–229.
Chang, Sun-Yung A.; Gursky, Matthew J.; Yang, Paul C. An equation of Monge-Ampère type in conformal geometry, and four-manifolds of positive Ricci curvature. Ann. of Math. (2) 155 (2002), no. 3, 709–787.
Chang, S.-Y. A.; Wilson, J. M.; Wolff, T. H. Some weighted norm inequalities concerning the Schrödinger operators. Comment. Math. Helv. 60 (1985), no. 2, 217–246.
Carleson, Lennart; Chang, Sun-Yung A. On the existence of an extremal function for an inequality of J. Moser. Bull. Sci. Math. (2) 110 (1986), no. 2, 113–127.
Chang, Sun-Yung A.; Fefferman, Robert Some recent developments in Fourier analysis and -theory on product domains. Bull. Amer. Math. Soc. (N.S.) 12 (1985), no. 1, 1–43.
Ann. of Math. (2) 112 (1980), no. 1, 179–201.

References

External links

 AWM Fellows List 2019 

Princeton University faculty
Members of the United States National Academy of Sciences
Living people
1948 births
American women mathematicians
Fellows of the American Mathematical Society
Fellows of the Association for Women in Mathematics
20th-century American mathematicians
21st-century American mathematicians
People from Xi'an
National Taiwan University alumni
University of California, Berkeley alumni
University of California, Los Angeles faculty
Mathematicians from Shaanxi
American people of Chinese descent
Chinese women mathematicians
Taiwanese people from Shaanxi
20th-century women mathematicians
21st-century women mathematicians
Educators from Shaanxi
20th-century American women
21st-century American women
Members of the Royal Swedish Academy of Sciences